The Tragedy of Castle Rottersheim (German: Die Tragödie auf Schloss Rottersheim) is a 1916 Austrian silent drama film directed by Jacob Fleck and Luise Fleck and starring Hermann Benke, Liane Haid and Cordy Millowitsch.

Location shooting took place around Laxenburg.

Cast
 Hermann Benke as Graf Alwin Rottersheim 
 Liane Haid as Lieserl 
 Cordy Millowitsch as Gräfin Rottersheim 
 Karl Baumgartner as Pfarrer 
 Rudolf Beer as Schorsch Stelzer, Musikant 
 Stina Christophersen
 Marietta Hofer as Annerl 
 Walter Hofer as Ferdl 
 Polly Janisch as Frau Mali Stelzer 
 Grete Lundt as Baronin Elsa Hartwig 
 Karl Pfann as Baron Erich Hartwig 
 Otto Storm as Graf Alfons von Rhelen

References

Bibliography
 Parish, Robert. Film Actors Guide. Scarecrow Press, 1977.

External links

Austro-Hungarian films
1916 films
Austrian silent feature films
Austrian drama films
Films directed by Jacob Fleck
Films directed by Luise Fleck
Austrian black-and-white films
1916 drama films
Silent drama films
1910s German-language films